established in 1925 by  a committee of senior experts of several sword traditions for the curriculum of the Rikugun Toyama Gakkō. 

The special school for training army personnel founded in 1873, called Rikugun Toyama Gakkō or "Toyama Army Academy" in Toyama, Tokyo, Japan, led to the establishment of Toyama-ryu. Today, separate lines of Toyama-ryū are primarily located in the Kantō, Tokai and Kansai region of Japan.

Background 
After the Meiji Restoration, officers in the Japanese Army were required to carry Western-style sabres.  During the 1920s Japan went through a phase of Militant Nationalism that lasted until defeat in the Second World War. By adopting the katana, the traditional sword of the samurai, the Japanese were allying themselves with the samurai military tradition. Adopting the katana also served to calm discontent among the more politicized sections of the army who had been outraged at mechanization (another lesson learned from World War I) which had de-emphasized the role of infantry and cavalry.

In 1925, since not all officers had sufficient background in kenjutsu to deploy these weapons in combat, a simplified form of sword technique was devised that emphasized the most essential points of drawing and cutting. Takano Sasaburo and Nakayama Hakudo were senior teachers at the academy. Academy director Lieutenant Colonel Morinaga Kiyoshi (森永清 中佐) selected 5 kata from Nakayama's Omori-ryu to serve as the basis of the "Gunto no Soho". The system was further refined by committee. 

The army iai-battō kata differ from those of many koryū sword schools in that all techniques are practised from a standing position. Also, this modern ryū has a strong emphasis on tameshigiri, or "test-cutting."

At the end of World War II, the Toyama Military Academy became the U.S. Army's Camp Zama. Nonetheless, the military iai system was revived after 1952. By the 1970s, three separate organizations represented Toyama-ryū Iaido: in Hokkaidō, the Greater Japan Toyama Ryu Iaido Federation (established by Yamaguchi Yuuki); in Kansai (Kyoto-Osaka area), the Toyama Ryu Iaido Association (established by Morinaga Kiyoshi former Head Instructor of the Toyama Academy); and the All-Japan Toyama Ryu Iaido Federation (established by Nakamura Taizaburo). Each of these organizations was autonomous. 

Today, there are many active instructors of Gunto no Soho and all three mainline Toyama-ryū schools (Moringa-ha, Nakamura-ha and Yamaguchi-ha) inside and outside Japan, licensed by several organizations including the Zen Nihon Toyama-ryu Iaido Renmei (ZNTIR), the Toyama-ryu Iai-Batto Do Renmei (TIBDR), The International Battodo Federation (IBF), the Zen Nihon Battodo Renmei (ZNBDR), the International Shinkendo Federation, The United States Federation of Batto-do (USFBD) and the International Batto-Do Rengo-Kai. 

As well as in the Czech republic (Czech Toyama Ryu Federation), Sweden, Poland, Australia, England and Italy.

See also 
 Battōjutsu
 Imperial Japanese Army Academy
 Tameshigiri
 Nakayama Hakudō

References 

Zen Nihon Toyama Ryū Renmei (全日本戸山流居合道連盟). url=http://toyamaryuiaido.jp/index_en.html

Toyama Ryū Iai-Battodo Renmei (戸山流居合抜刀道連盟). url=https://www.toyamaryuiaibattodo.com/home

Kokusai Batto Renmei (中村流/). url=https://www.ibf-battodo.org

Zen Nihon Battodo Renmei (全日本抜刀道連盟). url=https://znbatto.com/en/about

Kokusai Toyama Ryū Renmei url=https://www.toyama-ryu.org.

International Batto-Do Rengo-Kai (国際戸山流連盟) url=https://www.genbukai-hq.org/batto/batto-history.php

Dai Nihon Dentô Morinaga Toyama-Ryu Iai-Do Rengō-kai

Nihon Toyama Ryu Iaido So-Renmei

Japanese swordsmanship
Gendai budo
Japanese martial arts
Iaido